Tihad Sportif Casablanca was a Moroccan football club that was founded in 1936 and disbanded in 2003 following the merger with FUS Rabat. The club still survive in other sports sections, notably including basketball and volleyball.

References

Football clubs in Morocco
Football clubs in Casablanca
2003 disestablishments in Morocco